Karl Bortoli (born 4 October 1912, date of death unknown) was an Austrian international footballer.

References

1912 births
Year of death unknown
Association football forwards
Austrian footballers
Austria international footballers
First Vienna FC players
Place of birth missing